Hedda Hopper (born Elda Furry; May 2, 1885February 1, 1966) was an American gossip columnist and actress. At the height of her influence in the 1940s, her readership was 35 million. A strong supporter of the House Un-American Activities Committee (HUAC) hearings, Hopper named suspected communists and was a major proponent of the Hollywood blacklist. Hopper continued to write gossip until the end of her life, her work appearing in many magazines and later on radio. She had an extended feud with another gossip columnist, arch-rival Louella Parsons.

Early life
Hopper was born Elda Furry in Hollidaysburg, Pennsylvania, the daughter of Margaret  (née Miller; 1856–1941) and David Furry, a butcher, both members of the German Baptist Brethren. Her family was of Pennsylvania Dutch (German) descent. The family moved to Altoona when Elda was three.

Career

Acting

She eventually ran away to New York City and began her career in the chorus on the Broadway stage. Hopper was not successful in this venture. Florenz Ziegfeld called the aspiring starlet a "clumsy cow" and brushed off her pleas for a slot in his lavish Follies. After a few years, she joined the theater company of matinee idol DeWolf Hopper, whom she called "Wolfie" and would later marry. 

She remained in the chorus and they toured the country. While in the Hopper company, she realized that chorus and understudy jobs were not acting. She wanted to act, and she knew she would have to prove herself before she could hope to get anywhere in the theater. Hearing that Edgar Selwyn was casting his play The Country Boy for a road tour, she went to his office and talked him into letting her audition for the lead. She was given the role and that show toured for thirty-five weeks through forty-eight states. She studied singing during the summer and, in the fall, toured with The Quaker Girl in the second lead, the prima donna role. The show closed in Albany.

In 1913, she became the fifth wife of DeWolf Hopper, whose previous wives were named Ella, Ida, Edna and Nella. The similarity in names caused some friction, as he would sometimes call Elda by the name of one of his former wives. Consequently, Elda Hopper paid a numerologist $10 to tell her what name she should use, and the answer was "Hedda". She began acting in silent movies in 1915. Her motion picture debut was in The Battle of Hearts (1916) with William Farnum, but she made a major splash in Virtuous Wives (1918), in which she established her pattern of playing society women. Hopper decided to upstage the film's headline starlet, Anita Stewart, by spending all of her $5,000 salary on a lavish wardrobe from the upscale boutique Lucile, which she wore in the film. By 1920, she was commanding $1,000 per week as a free agent in New York; in 1923 she moved to Hollywood and became a contract player for Louis B. Mayer Pictures. She appeared in more than 120 movies over her 23 year acting career.

Writing
As Hopper's movie career waned in the mid-1930s, she looked for other sources of income. In 1935, she agreed to write a weekly Hollywood gossip column for The Washington Herald at $50 a week, which was cancelled after four months when she refused to take a $15 pay cut.

In 1937, Hopper was offered another gossip column opportunity, this time with the Los Angeles Times. Her column, entitled "Hedda Hopper's Hollywood", debuted on February 14, 1938. Hopper could not type, nor spell very well, so she dictated her column to a typist over the phone. Hopper used her extensive contacts forged during her acting days to gather material for her column. Her first major scoop had national implications: in 1939, Hopper printed that President Franklin Roosevelt's son James Roosevelt was divorcing his wife Betsey after being caught in an affair with a nurse at the Mayo Clinic.

Part of Hopper's public image was her fondness for wearing extravagant hats, for which the Internal Revenue Service allowed her a $5,000 annual tax deduction as a work expense.  During the Second World War, the Nazis used photographs of Hopper in her extravagant hats for propaganda, as a symbol of "American decadence". Her annual income was $250,000, enabling her to live an upscale lifestyle and maintain a mansion in Beverly Hills, which she described as "the house that fear built".

After Hopper printed a story about an extramarital affair between Joseph Cotten and Deanna Durbin, Cotten ran into Hopper at a social event and pulled out her chair, only to continue pulling it out from under her when she sat down. The next day, he received dozens of flower bouquet deliveries and congratulatory telegrams from others in the industry, thanking him for having the courage to do what everyone else dreamed of doing.

Hopper spread rumors that Michael Wilding and Stewart Granger had a sexual relationship; Wilding sued Hopper for libel and won.

Hopper was an advocate for actress Joan Crawford, whose career suffered in the early 1940s after she was labelled "Box-Office Poison" and forced to resign from Metro-Goldwyn-Mayer. In 1945, Hopper reprinted a press release for Mildred Pierce in her column, which described Crawford as a leading contender for the Best Actress Oscar. Such was Hopper's influence that she was credited with swinging the decision in Crawford's favor when she won the award. Hopper's support has been described as the first instance of lobbying the Academy of Motion Picture Arts and Sciences to favor a certain nominee.

Actress ZaSu Pitts compared Hopper to "a ferret".

Joan Bennett sent Hopper a "$435 valentine. The $35 went for a skunk which carried a note: 'Won't you be my valentine? Nobody else will. I stink and so do you.'" Hopper reportedly commented that the skunk was beautifully behaved. She called it Joan, and passed it on to actor James Mason and his wife as a present, as they had made the first bid after the story about the unusual gift made the news.

During World War II, Hopper's only child, actor William "Bill" Hopper, served in the Navy in Underwater Demolitions. She chastised Douglas Fairbanks Jr., the son of her old friend Douglas Fairbanks, because she thought the younger Fairbanks was shirking his duty to his country. Fairbanks Jr. recalled in his memoirs Salad Days that he was already in uniform serving in the United States Navy, and despised Hopper for her insinuations.

Actor Kirk Douglas recounted an interaction between Hopper and Elizabeth Taylor. At the premiere of Taylor and husband Richard Burton's film The Sandpiper (1965), Hopper began to complain when she saw screenwriter Dalton Trumbo's screen credit (she had led the charge in blacklisting Trumbo for his Communist party membership). This led Taylor to turn around and say "Hedda, why don't you just shut the fuck up?"

In 1963, Hopper complained in her column that three out of five Best Actor Oscar nominees were British and only two were American: "The weather's so foul on that tight little isle that, to get in out of the rain, they all gather in theatres and practise Hamlet on each other."

Feud with Louella Parsons
When Hopper had initially come to Hollywood, she and Louella Parsons had a mutually beneficial arrangement. Hopper was then a moderately successful actress, and according to Parson's successor, Dorothy Manners, "if anything happened on a set—if a star and leading man were having an affair—Hedda would give Louella a call.” In return, Hedda was guaranteed a few lines of copy under Louella's increasingly influential byline.

After MGM canceled her contract, Hopper struggled to maintain her career as an actress. She was offered a position as a Hollywood columnist by the Esquire Feature Syndicate due to a recommendation by Andy Hervey of MGM’s publicity department.

One of the first papers to pick up “Hedda Hopper’s Hollywood” was the Los Angeles Times, a morning paper like Louella's Examiner. Hopper first publicly scooped Parsons with the divorce of the president's son Jimmy Roosevelt (a Goldwyn employee), who was involved with a Mayo Clinic nurse, from his wife, Betsey. The story became front-page news across the country.

Citizen Kane
When rumors began to surface that Orson Welles debut film Citizen Kane was inspired by Hearst's life, Parsons lunched with the director, and believed his evasions and denials. Hopper arrived uninvited to an early screening of the film and wrote a scathing critique, calling it a "vicious and irresponsible attack on a great man". As a result, Hearst sent Parsons a letter complaining that he had learned about Citizen Kane from Hopper, and not her.

On the warpath, Parsons then demanded a private screening of the film, and threatened RKO chief George Schaefer on Hearst's behalf, first with a lawsuit, and then with a vague but powerful threat of consequences for everyone in Hollywood. On January 10, Parsons and two lawyers working for Hearst were given a private screening of the film. Horrified by what she saw, Louella rushed out of the studio screening room to cable Hearst, who telegraphed back the terse message "Stop Citizen Kane". Soon after, Parsons called Schaefer and threatened RKO with a lawsuit if they released Kane. She also warned other studio heads that she would expose the private lives of people throughout the industry and reveal long-suppressed scandalous information.

When Schaefer—who had also been threatened by Hearst with legal action—announced that Citizen Kane was scheduled to premiere in February 1941 at Radio City Music Hall, Parsons contacted the manager of Radio City Music Hall and advised him that exhibiting the film would result in a press blackout. The premiere was canceled. Other exhibitors were fearful of being sued by Hearst and refused to show the film. As a result, despite support from Hearst adversaries such as Henry Luce, on release overall the film lost money. Parsons was by no means alone in her campaign against Citizen Kane but Welles never quite recovered his position in Hollywood afterward.

Ingrid Bergman
In the early 1950s, the Los Angeles Examiner ran on its front page above Parsons's byline: "Ingrid Bergman Baby Due in Three Months at Rome". Bergman had left her husband, neurologist Peter Lindstrom, to live in Italy with director Roberto Rossellini, but the news that she might be pregnant was met with some skepticism. Bergman was well known for the angelic role of Sister Benedict in The Bells of St. Mary's.

Hopper, who had been a public supporter of Bergman, had believed the actress' denial of the pregnancy, and printed a fervent repudiation of the rumor. However, Bergman was indeed pregnant and Hopper, enraged at being scooped, launched a PR campaign decrying Bergman for being pregnant out of wedlock, and carrying a married man's child. Parsons had allegedly received the tip from Howard Hughes, who was incensed at Bergman for being unable to shoot a film for him as promised.

Reaction
Reportedly, whereas Hopper was more inclined to see their much-publicized antagonism as funny and good for business, Parsons took it personally and saw Hopper as a rival in every possible way. Hopper also referred to Doc Martin as "that goddamn clap doctor", which infuriated Parsons.

It has been suggested that Hopper was set up as a columnist by Louis B. Mayer (with the blessing of other studio chiefs) to offset Louella's monopolistic power. Gossip columnist Liz Smith, stated that: "The studios created both of them. And they thought they could control both of them. But they became Frankenstein monsters escaped from the labs." Hopper and Parsons had a combined readership of 75 million in a country of 160 million.

Politics
Hopper was a fervent Republican. During the 1944 presidential election, for instance, she spoke before a massive rally organized by David O. Selznick in the Los Angeles Coliseum in support of the Dewey-Bricker ticket, as well as Governor Earl Warren of California, who later became Dewey's running mate in 1948, and later the Chief Justice of the United States. The gathering drew 93,000, with Cecil B. DeMille as the master of ceremonies, and Walt Disney as one of the speakers. Others in attendance included Ronald Reagan, Barbara Stanwyck,  Ann Sothern, Ginger Rogers, Randolph Scott, Adolphe Menjou, Dick Powell, Gary Cooper, Edward Arnold, and William Bendix. Despite the good turnout at the rally, most Hollywood celebrities who took a public position sided with the Roosevelt-Truman ticket.

Hopper strongly supported the House Un-American Activities Committee (HUAC) hearings, and was a guest and speaker of the Women's Division at the 1956 Republican National Convention held in San Francisco to renominate the Eisenhower–Nixon ticket.

She was so well known for her conservatism that rumor had it she planned to stand up, unfurl an American flag, and walk out of the 23rd Academy Awards ceremony in March 1951 if Jose Ferrer, who was known to be a socialist, should win Best Actor. The rumor was untrue, but Hopper joked that she wished she had thought of it. Screenwriter Jay Bernstein related that when he told Hopper that many people in Hollywood privately called her a Nazi because of her extreme conservatism, the gossip columnist began to cry and replied: "Jay, all I've ever tried to be is a good American."

Blacklisting
Hopper was one of the driving forces behind the creation of the Hollywood blacklist, using her 35 million strong readership to destroy the careers of those in the entertainment industry whom she suspected of being a Communist, having Communist sympathies, being homosexual, or leading dissolute lives. She was a leading member of the Motion Picture Alliance for the Preservation of American Ideals, founded in 1944 and devoted to rooting out suspected Communists in Hollywood. She considered herself to be a guardian of moral standards in Hollywood and bragged that she need only wag her finger at a producer and he would break off an adulterous affair instantly.

One of Hopper's victims was screenwriter Dalton Trumbo, who was blacklisted throughout the late 1940s and 1950s partially through Hopper's consistently negative coverage of his Communist Party membership. When actor Kirk Douglas hired Trumbo to write the screenplay for Spartacus (1960), Hopper denounced the film in her column, stating that "[the script is based on] a book written by a Commie and the screen script was written by a Commie, so don't go see it." The film was a critical and financial success.

Charlie Chaplin was another target of Hedda Hopper's vitriol because of his alleged Communist sympathies and his relationships with much younger women, which she considered immoral despite her own marriage to a man 27 years her senior. She also objected to him for remaining a British citizen and not becoming an American, which she considered an act of ingratitude towards a country which had given him so much. When in 1943, he denied that he was the father of 22-year old actress Joan Barry's child, Hopper assisted Barry in filing a paternity suit against Chaplin, launching a campaign of attrition against him through her column, and calling for him to be deported for his "moral turpitude". She defended her behavior by stating that she wished to make an example of Chaplin as "a warning to others involved in dubious relationships." Her grudge deepened when, later in the year, Chaplin married 18-year old Oona O'Neill and gave the scoop to Louella Parsons out of dislike for Hopper. For years after the paternity trial, Hopper cooperated with the FBI to destabilize Chaplin's career. This involved her printing damaging information leaked by the FBI concerning Chaplin's past Communist affiliations, while Hopper in turn provided the agency with unsavory gossip about Chaplin's personal life gleaned from her informants. Her sustained criticism of Chaplin was one of the factors which contributed to his being denied re-entry to the United States in 1952.

Actress Ingrid Bergman was also blacklisted as a result of Hedda Hopper's sustained negative coverage in her columns. Hopper had supported Bergman in her column throughout the 1940s, advocating for her to land starring roles in The Bells of St. Mary's (1945) and Joan of Arc (1948). She was enraged when Bergman lied to her about being pregnant with married director Roberto Rossellini's baby. Hopper had believed Bergman's denial of the pregnancy, printing a fervent repudiation of the rumor in 1949. However, Bergman was indeed pregnant, and the news was leaked to Hopper's arch-rival Louella Parsons, who gained the scoop. Seeking revenge, Hopper launched a PR campaign decrying Bergman for being pregnant out of wedlock and carrying a married man's child.

Radio and television

Hopper had an acting role in a radio soap opera, playing Portia Brent on the Blue Network's Brenthouse beginning in February 1939. She debuted as host of her own radio program, The Hedda Hopper Show, November 6, 1939. Sponsored by Sunkist, she was heard on CBS three times a week for 15 minutes until October 30, 1942. From October 2, 1944, to September 3, 1945, Armour Treet sponsored a once-a-week program. On September 10, 1945, she moved to ABC, still sponsored by Armour, for a weekly program that continued until June 3, 1946. Hopper moved back to CBS beginning on October 5, 1946 with a weekly 15-minute program, This Is Hollywood, sponsored by Procter & Gamble. It ran until June 28, 1947.

Expanding to 30 minutes on NBC, she was host of a variety series, The Hedda Hopper Show, broadcast from October 14, 1950, to November 11, 1950 on Saturdays, then from November 19, 1950, to May 20, 1951 on Sundays. This program featured music, talk and dramatized excerpts from movies with well-known guests, such as Broderick Crawford reprising a scene from All the King's Men (1949).

On January 10, 1960, a television special, Hedda Hopper's Hollywood, aired on NBC. Hosted by Hopper, guest interviews included a remarkably eclectic mix of past, current and future stars: Lucille Ball (a longtime friend of Hopper), Francis X. Bushman, Liza Minnelli, John Cassavetes, Robert Cummings, Marion Davies (her last public appearance), Walt Disney, Janet Gaynor, Bob Hope, Hope Lange, Anthony Perkins, Debbie Reynolds, James Stewart, and Gloria Swanson. 

Hopper had several acting roles during the latter part of her career, including brief cameo appearances as herself in the movie Sunset Boulevard (1950) and The Patsy (1964), as well as episodes of I Love Lucy, The Ford Show, Starring Tennessee Ernie Ford, and The Beverly Hillbillies, starring Buddy Ebsen. Her autobiography, From Under My Hat (Doubleday, 1952) was followed by The Whole Truth and Nothing But (1962), also published by Doubleday. She remained active as a writer until her death, producing six daily columns and a Sunday column for the Chicago Tribune syndicate, as well as writing articles for celebrity magazines such as Photoplay.

Personal life
On May 8, 1913, Hopper married actor and singer DeWolf Hopper in New Jersey. They had one child, William, who later played Paul Drake in the Perry Mason series. The couple divorced in 1922.

Death
Hopper died on February 1, 1966, of double pneumonia at the age of 80 in Cedars-Sinai Medical Center in Los Angeles.  The probate value of Hopper's estate was $472,661 gross and $306,679 net. She is buried at Rose Hill Cemetery, Altoona, Pennsylvania.

For her contribution to the motion picture industry, Hopper has a star on the Hollywood Walk of Fame at 6313½ Hollywood Boulevard in Hollywood.

Filmography

In popular culture

Portrayals
 The character of Patty Benedict in The Big Knife (1955) played by Ilka Chase is likely inspired by Hedda Hopper. In the film, she is an influential gossip columnist who threatens to publish an old scandal involving the main character if he does not give her information on his struggling marriage. The film is an adaption of a play of the same name written by Clifford Odets.
 Jane Alexander received a Primetime Emmy Award nomination portraying Hopper in the television film Malice in Wonderland (1985), opposite Elizabeth Taylor as Louella Parsons.
 Cynthia Adler portrayed Hedda Hopper in the documentary Carmen Miranda: Bananas is My Business (1995).
 Hopper was portrayed by Katherine Helmond in the television film Liz: The Elizabeth Taylor Story (1995).
 Rue McClanahan played Priscilla Tremaine, a thinly veiled version of Hopper, on the AMC's show The Lot (1999), a comedic limited series about the Golden Age of Hollywood.
 Fiona Shaw played Hopper in the movie RKO 281 (1999), which is concerned with the making of Citizen Kane (1941).
 By Ingrid van Bergen in The Man in the Moon (2002). A Radio-ballett with Charlie Chaplin. A piece for Acoustic Stage Dt. Der Mann im Mond. Ein Radio-Ballett mit Charlie Chaplin. Stück für Akustische Bühne. Written by Evelyn Dörr, and broadcast on WDR in 2002.
 By Joanne Linville in the television film James Dean (2001).
 By Jenn Colella in Chaplin: The Musical during 2006 and on Broadway in 2012.
 Helen Mirren played Hedda Hopper in the movie Trumbo (2015), directed by Jay Roach.
 Tilda Swinton played in Hail, Caesar! (2016),  the double part of Thora and Thessaly Thacker, two identical twin sister gossip columnists (mimicking the rivalry between Hedda Hopper and Louella Parsons, but both heavily based on Hopper herself).
 In the first season of Feud in 2017, Hopper was played by Judy Davis and received a Primetime Emmy Award nomination in the portrayal of the rivalry between Bette Davis and Joan Crawford.
 The New York City Opera announced that it will stage the East Coast premiere of Stewart Wallace's Hopper's Wife – a 1997 chamber opera about an imagined marriage between painter Edward Hopper and Hedda Hopper – at Harlem Stage from April 28 through May 1, 2016.

See also

 Jimmie Fidler

References

Further reading
 "Evolution of a Vamp, The," Photoplay, February 1921, p. 26. Photo-illustrated Hedda Hopper profile.
 Frost, Jennifer. "Hedda Hopper, Hollywood Gossip, and the Politics of Racial Representation in Film, 1946–1948," Journal of African American History, 93 (Winter 2008), 36–63.
 Rogers, John E. "An Amazing Lady," Photoplay, October 1932, p. 49. "When Garbo met Hedda." "Amazing Lady" refers to Hopper.

External links
 
 
 
 
 Hedda Hopper: Broadway Photographs (University of South Carolina)
 portraits (NYPublic Library, Billy Rose collection)
 

American gossip columnists
American women columnists
1885 births
1966 deaths
American film actresses
20th-century American memoirists
American women memoirists
American radio personalities
American silent film actresses
American stage actresses
American television actresses
Television personalities from Los Angeles
American women television personalities
Burials in Pennsylvania
Actresses from Pennsylvania
People from Altoona, Pennsylvania
Los Angeles Times people
Writers from Los Angeles
California Republicans
Deaths from pneumonia in California
People from Hollidaysburg, Pennsylvania
American people of Pennsylvania Dutch descent
American people of German descent
20th-century American actresses
20th-century American women writers
20th-century American journalists
Old Right (United States)
United Service Organizations entertainers